Enkhtaivany Chimeddolgor (born 29 January 1993) is a Mongolian basketball player. She competed in the 2020 Summer Olympics.

References

External links
 
 
 

1993 births
Living people
3x3 basketball players at the 2020 Summer Olympics
Olympic 3x3 basketball players of Mongolia
Mongolian women's 3x3 basketball players